Daniel Howard Fernandez (born 5 March 1995) is an English and Singaporean chess player and author.

Career
Born in Stockport, England, Fernandez was the joint under-9 British champion in 2004. Shortly afterwards, his family relocated to Singapore, where he was a member of that country's  National Junior Squad. While living there, he attained the title of International Master in 2010. In team competitions, Fernandez represented Singapore in the Chess Olympiad in 2010 and 2012, and in the Under-16 Chess Olympiad in 2007.

Between 2011 and 2018, Fernandez lived in the United Kingdom, where he attended the Manchester Grammar School and Queens' College, Cambridge. He was the British under-18 champion in 2013 and the British under-21 champion in 2014. Fernandez was awarded the title of Grandmaster in October 2017, at the 88th FIDE Congress held in Goynuk, Antalya, Turkey.

Fernandez writes periodically on the specialist news site ChessBase.

Personal life
Fernandez was born in England to a Singaporean father of Indian descent and an English mother. He moved to Singapore in 2004 with his parents, before returning to England to study.

Publications 
 Fernandez, Daniel (2018). The Modernized Caro-Kann: A Complete Repertoire against 1.e4. Thinkers Publishing. 
 Daniel Fernandez (2018). The Reliable Petroff - An Evergreen Elite Choice. Fritztrainer opening DVD, ChessBase.

References

External links
 
 
 
 Bisik-bisik with GM Daniel Fernandez

1995 births
Living people
English chess players
British chess writers
Singaporean chess players
English people of Singaporean descent
English people of Indian descent
Singaporean people of English descent
Singaporean people of Indian descent
Chess grandmasters
People from Stockport
People educated at Manchester Grammar School
Alumni of Queens' College, Cambridge
English expatriate sportspeople in Singapore